Fiorella Betti (1927–2001) was an Italian actress. She was also a voice actress, dubbing a number of actresses in postwar Italian films.

Born Delia Betti in Rome, she debuted at very young age, and is best known for the lead role in  Camillo Mastrocinque's  Lost in the Dark. In the 1950s she focused her career on dubbing, lending her voice to Hollywood stars such as Elizabeth Taylor, Grace Kelly, Natalie Wood and Jean Simmons.

Selected filmography
 Captain Fracasse (1940)
 Sleeping Beauty (1942)
 The Champion (1943)
 Lost in the Dark (1947)
 Eleven Men and a Ball (1948)
 Tragic Spell (1951)
 VIP my Brother Superman (1968)

References

External links

1927 births
2001 deaths
Italian voice actresses
Italian film actresses
Actresses from Rome